The Chengdu Culture Park is an urban park in the city of Chengdu, Sichuan, China.

The park is located at West Section 2, 1st Ring Road, near the Qingyang Taoist Temple and Wenjun Qintai Park. It covers 71,326 m2 with greenery, a lake, large stones, statues, a teahouse, and towers.

In the early 1950s, the city government created an avenue on paddy fields near Qingyang Temple to exhibit and trade flowers. Following the eighth flower exhibition, the avenue was converted into the Qingyang Temple Garden, with surrounding walls. In 1966, the park was renamed by the city government as the Chengdu Culture Park.

Features at the park include the Relief Art Wall, the Shi’er Qiao Martyrs’ Tombs, and the Zhiji Rock and Octagonal Pavilion.

See also
 Tianfu Art Park, Chengdu

References

External links
 

1966 establishments in China
Parks in Chengdu
Urban public parks
Culture in Chengdu
Arts in Chengdu!-- in particular -->